Parasgad was a constituency of the Legislative Assembly in the Indian state of Karnataka. The constituency ceased to exist in 2008, following the redrawing of constituency boundaries. It was a part of larger Belagavi parliamentary constituency. It is succeeded by Saundatti Yellamma constituency.

Members of Legislative Assembly

Bombay State (1951–1957) 
 1951 : Hemappa Veerbhadrappa Kaujalgi, Indian National Congress

Mysore State (1957–1973) 
 1957 : Shankar Rao Bindoo Rao Padaki, IndependentIndian National Congress
 1962 : Venkaraddi Shidaraddi Timmaraddi, Indian National Congress
 1967 : K. H. Veerabhadrappa, Indian National Congress
 1972 : Shankar Rao Bindoo Rao Padaki, Indian National Congress

Karnataka State (1973–2008) 
 1978 : Gudanshah Khanashah Takked, Indian National Congress
 1983 : Ramanagouda Venkanagouda Patil, Indian National Congress
 1985 : Chandrashekhar Mallikarjun Mamani, Independent
 1989 : Subhas Shiddaramappa Koujalagi, Indian National Congress (Indira)
 1994 : Chandrashekhar Mallikarjun Mamani, Janata Dal
 1999 : Koujalagi Subhas Siddaramappa, Independent
 2004 : Vishwanath Karabasappa Mamani, Independent
 2008 : Constituency ceases to exist. See Saundatti Yellamma constituency

Election Results

1985 Assembly
 Chandrashekhar Mallikarjun Mamani (Ind) : 41,095 votes
 Patil Ramanggoud Venkangoud (INC) : 27,793

1989 Assembly
 Koujalagi Subhas Shiddaramappa (INC) : 44,777
 Chandra Sekhar Mallikarjun Mamani (JD) : 36,627

See also 
 List of constituencies of Karnataka Legislative Assembly

References 

Former assembly constituencies of Karnataka